Charles John Halswell Kemeys-Tynte, 9th Baron Wharton (12 January 1908 - 22 July 1969) was a British aristocrat. He was the son of Charles Theodore Halswell Kemeys-Tynte, 8th Baron Wharton.

He was educated at Christ Church, Oxford, he then served in World War II from 1939 to 45 as Flight Lieutenant of the Royal Air Force Volunteer Reserve. He married Joanna, née Law-Smith, widow of the 6th Baron Tredegar, who was previously the wife of the late Commander Archibald Boyd Russell. After his death, the Barony devolved upon his sister Elisabeth Vintcent, 10th Baroness Wharton.

References 
 Burke's Peerage & Baronetage 107th edition.

1908 births
1969 deaths
Alumni of Christ Church, Oxford
Barons Wharton
20th-century English nobility